Maimuna Amadu Murashko (née Diko; ; ; born 28 May 1980), known professionally as simply Maimuna, is a Belarusian violinist who represented Belarus in the Eurovision Song Contest 2015 along with Uzari with the song "Time".

Early life

Maimuna was born in Saint Petersburg, Russia to a Belarusian mother and a Malian father. When she was young, her family moved to Mali, but being unable to adapt to the hot climate, Maimuna moved in with her grandmother in Mogilev, Belarus, where she was raised.

Career

1990–2013: early career

Maimuna has participated in several international competitions throughout her career such including the 1990 Young Virtuoso competition in Kiev and the 1996 Music of Hope competition.

2014–present: Eurovision Song Contest 2015

On 5 December 2014, Maimuna was announced as one of the competitions in Eurofest 2015 along with Uzari performing the song "Time". Uzari and Maimuna won the competition with 76 points, placing third in the televote and first in three of the five jurors' scores. They represented Belarus at the Eurovision Song Contest 2015. Uzari and Maimuna failed to pass semi final 1 in the contest. They finished 12th in semi-final 1.

See also

Belarus in the Eurovision Song Contest 2015

Official Facebook Group of Uzari&Maimuna

References

External links

1980 births
Eurovision Song Contest entrants of 2015
Living people
Eurovision Song Contest entrants for Belarus
Belarusian violinists
People from Mogilev
Belarusian people of Malian descent
Russian emigrants to Belarus
21st-century violinists